Tina Samara (born July 26, 1974) is an American former professional tennis player.

Biography
Samara was born in Oslo, to a Norwegian mother and Sri Lankan father, before later settling in Laurel Hollow, New York.

From 1992 to 1996, Samara attended the University of Georgia, where she was a two-time All-American in tennis. She was a member of Georgia's NCAA championship winning team in 1994, partnering with Stacy Sheppard to win the title deciding doubles match. She and Sheppard became college tennis' top ranked doubles pairing in 1995.

Samara represented her birth country Norway in the Fed Cup, appearing in a total of 12 ties between 1996 and 1998. As a professional player she was most successful in doubles, with a best ranking of 223 and one ITF title. She twice featured in the singles qualifying draw for the US Open.

An experienced coach in college tennis, since 2008 she has been a head coach at the University of Louisiana at Lafayette, West Virginia University, University of Wisconsin-Madison and the University of the Pacific.

ITF finals

Doubles: 7 (1–6)

References

External links
 
 
 

1974 births
Living people
American female tennis players
Norwegian female tennis players
Tennis people from New York (state)
Georgia Lady Bulldogs tennis players
American tennis coaches
People from Laurel Hollow, New York
American people of Sri Lankan descent
American people of Norwegian descent
Norwegian people of Sri Lankan descent
Sportspeople from Oslo